The 1969 Virginia Cavaliers football team represented the University of Virginia during the 1969 NCAA University Division football season. The Cavaliers were led by fifth-year head coach George Blackburn and played their home games at Scott Stadium in Charlottesville, Virginia. They competed as members of the Atlantic Coast Conference, finishing in last.

Schedule

References

Virginia
Virginia Cavaliers football seasons
Virginia Cavaliers football